The 1993–94 Eastern Counties Football League season was the 52nd in the history of Eastern Counties Football League a football competition in England.

Premier Division

The Premier Division featured 20 clubs which competed in the division last season, along with two new clubs, promoted from Division One:
Soham Town Rangers
Sudbury Wanderers

League table

Division One

Division One featured 16 clubs which competed in the division last season, along with two new clubs, relegated from the Premier Division:
Brantham Athletic
Brightlingsea United

League table

References

External links
 Eastern Counties Football League

1993-94
1993–94 in English football leagues